The Eleanor Farjeon Award is made for distinguished service to the world of British children's books and is given to someone whose commitment and contribution is deemed to be outstanding. Founded in 1966, it is presented annually in memory of the celebrated author Eleanor Farjeon (1881–1965). The spirit of the award is to recognise the unsung heroes who contribute so much to every aspect of children's books. The award is administered by the Children's Book Circle and sponsored by the Eleanor Farjeon Trust.

Winners 
 1966, Margery Fisher
 1967,  Jessica Jenkins
 1968,  Brian Alderson, author, compiler and editor
 1969,  Anne Wood
 1970,  Kaye Webb
 1971,  Margaret Meek
 1972,  Janet Hill
 1973,  Eleanor Graham
 1974, Leila Berg
 1975,  Naomi Lewis
 1976,  Joyce Oldmeadow and Court Oldmeadow, booksellers and founders of Dromkeen Collection, Australia
 1977,  Elaine Moss
 1978,  Peter Kennerley
 1979,  Joy Whitby
 1980,  Dorothy Butler
 1981,  Margaret Marshall and Virginia Jensen
 1982,  Aidan Chambers and Nancy Chambers
 1983,  Jean Russell
 1984,  Shirley Hughes, author and illustrator
 1985,  Bob Leeson, writer
 1986,  Judith Elkin
 1987,  Valerie Bierman
 1988,  National Library for the Handicapped Child
 1989,  Anna Home
 1990,  Jill Bennett, illustrator
 1991,  Patricia Crampton
 1992,  Stephanie Nettell, Children's Book Editor of The Guardian 1978-92
 1993,  Susan Belgrave, MBE, Founder and President of Volunteer Reading Help
 1994,  Eileen Colwell, MBE, librarian and author
 1995,  Helen Paiba, author and bookseller
 1996,  Books for Keeps
 1997,  Michael Rosen, author
 1998,  Gina Pollinger
 1999,  Klaus Flugge, publisher, Andersen Press
 2000,  Julia Eccleshare, journalist
 2001,  Amelia Edwards, art director
 2002,  Philip Pullman, author
 2003,  Miriam Hodgson, editor
 2004,  Jacqueline Wilson, author
 2005,  Malorie Blackman, author
 2006,  Wendy Cooling, founder of Bookstart
 2007,  Jane Nissen, publisher
 2008, Chris Brown, educator and editor, School Library Association
 2009, Moira Arthur, former Managing Director of Peters Bookselling Services
 2010, Seven Stories, the Centre for Children's Books 
 2011, The Federation of Children's Book Groups
 2012, Quentin Blake, illustrator and author
 2013, David Almond, author
 2014, Polka Theatre, children's theatre
 2015, Terry Pratchett, author, awarded posthumously
 2016, John Agard, poet and playwright
 2017, Keats Community Library
 2018, Michael Morpurgo, author
 2019, CLPE, the Centre for Literacy in Primary Education

References

External links

 Children's Book Circle: Eleanor Farjeon Award

1966 establishments in the United Kingdom
Awards established in 1966
British children's literary awards
Literary awards honoring lifetime achievement